"Turn It Gold" is 7" vinyl single by Hesta Prynn. It was released on February 14, 2011. The A-side is a previously unreleased song called "Turn It Gold". The B-side is a remix of the same song. The song had already been performed live during her summer 2010 tour in support of Tegan & Sara and her early 2011 headline tour with fellow New York band Lion Of Ido as her support band.

Track listing

Personnel
 Hesta Prynn – vocals, keyboards
 All other instrumentation by Chuck Brody and Jon Siebels

References

2011 singles
2011 songs